Synchronicity is a concept first introduced by analytical psychologist Carl G. Jung "to describe circumstances that appear meaningfully related yet lack a causal connection."

Synchronicity may also refer to:

Albums and songs
 Synchronicity (The Police album), 1983
 "Synchronicity I", a 1983 song by The Police from the Synchronicity album
 "Synchronicity II", a 1983 song and single by The Police from the Synchronicity album
 Synchronicity (Bennie K album), 2004
 Synchronicity (Olivia Lufkin album), 2000
 "Synchronicity" (Yui Makino song), 2007
 "Synchronicity" (Nogizaka46 song), 2018

Other
 Synchronicity (book), a 1960 book about synchronicity by Carl Jung
 Synchronicity (film), a 2015 American science fiction film
 "Synchronicity" (Grimm), an episode of Grimm
 Synchronicity (Rock Festival, IIT Kanpur), India
 Sinchronicity, a BBC TV drama

See also
 Synchronic (disambiguation)
 Synchrony (disambiguation)
 Synchronizer (disambiguation)
 Synchronization, the coordination of events to operate a system in unison
 Synchronization (computer science)
 Synchronization (alternating current)